Charles Russen (1850 – 11 December 1914) was an English-born Australian politician.

He was elected to the Tasmanian Legislative Council in 1904 as the member for Launceston. He served until his death in 1914.

References

1850 births
1914 deaths
Independent members of the Parliament of Tasmania
Members of the Tasmanian Legislative Council
British emigrants to Australia